Mario Ciminaghi (born 1 February 1910, date of death unknown) was an Italian professional football player.

Honours
 Serie A champion: 1929/30.

1910 births
Year of death missing
Italian footballers
Serie A players
Inter Milan players
U.S. Catanzaro 1929 players
Association football midfielders